Liberal Republican Party may refer to:

Liberal Republican Party (Turkey), a short-lived party active in 1930
Liberal Republican Party (United States), which contested the 1872 presidential election

See also
Liberal Republican Right, an interwar party in Spain
Rockefeller Republican, a faction of the US Republican Party
Republican Liberal Party (Panama), a defunct political party in Panama
Republican Liberal Party (Portugal), an interwar party in Portugal